Yin & Yang is the second studio album by Serbian recording artist Nikolija. It was released digitally as a standard edition on April 25, 2019 through IDJTunes, but it also became available for purchase at physical retailers in an exclusive printing. The album spawned two singles: "Yin & Yang" and "Nije lako biti ja", and also included three standalone releases: "Loš momak" (2017), "Nema limita" and "Slažem" (2018) as bonus tracks. Musically, it has been characterized as a pop and hip hop record, while also including several other genre influences such as trap, tropical house, reggaeton and Serbian folk music. 

Every song from Yin & Yang was accompanied by a music video, making it Nikolija's second "visual album". As of October 2021, all the music videos have collected over 185 million of combined views on YouTube.

Background
Following the release of her previous record, No1 (2016), Nikolija began working on new songs in 2017, enlisting new writers and producers such as Slobodan Veljković Coby and other musicians from the hip-hop label Bassivity Digital. She announced her second album before the release of its lead single, "Yin & Yang", on March 29, 2019. "Nije lako biti ja", featuring Serbian rapper Fox, was then released on April 13 as the album's second single. On April 24, Nikolija also uploaded accompanying music videos for the rest five songs. Four of which, directed by Sherif Francis, were shot in the suburbs of Athens, Greece during April. While the visual for "Tigar" is a computer generated animation directed by Serbian artist Ljubba, who was also responsible for the music video of the title track.

In an interview with IDJTV, Jovanović stated that the album was initially planned to be a concept record, but eventually ended as "experimental" with every song in a different urban-orientated genre, which together create a cohesive body of work, thus comparing it to the ancient Chinese philosophy. She further revealed that the album was very personal to her, explaining "All the songs to a certain extent describe me, my personality, carry my energy and, not to be pretentious, but describe a music direction called Nikolija".

The album was promoted with a performance at the Belgrade's Freestyler nightclub on May 9th. Nikolija later appeared on the IDJTV stage at the Ulaz music festival, also in Belgrade, on July 12th. She then continued promoting the album throughout the summer, performing in nightclubs and music festivals all over the Balkans and European locations with Serbian diaspora.

Track listing
Credits adapted from Discogs.

Release history

References

Nikolija albums
2019 albums